South Barisan Malay, also called Central Malay or Middle Malay, is a collection of related Malayic isolects spoken in the southwestern part of Sumatra. None of the Central Malay isolects has more than one million speakers.

Name 
Traditionally, the term Middle Malay (a calque of Dutch ) is used when referring to this cluster. Later, to avoid misidentification with a temporal stage of Malay language (i.e. the transition between Old Malay and Modern Malay), the term Central Malay began to be used. McDonnell (2016) uses the term South Barisan Malay instead, referring to the southern region of the Barisan Mountains where these isolects are spoken.

Varieties 
Ethnologue groups together 12 isolects as part of Central Malay.
Benakat
Bengkulu
Besemah
Enim
Kikim
Kisam
Lematang Ulu
Lintang
Ogan
Rambang
Semendo
Serawai
There has been little research on individual isolects within the cluster.

References 

Malayic languages
Languages of Indonesia